Vahregan (also Romanized as Vahregān; also known as Vahreh) is a village in Pishkuh-e Mugui Rural District, in the Central District of Fereydunshahr County, Isfahan Province, Iran. At the 2006 census, its population was 72, in 16 families.

References 

Populated places in Fereydunshahr County